The Men's mass start event of the Biathlon World Championships 2013 was held on February 17, 2013. 30 athletes participated over a course of 15 km.

Results
The race was started at 15:00.

References

Men's mass start